Toni Mumford is the Deputy Associate Administrator for Management for NASA’s Human Exploration and Operations (HEO) Mission Directorate. She is located at Mary W. Jackson NASA Headquarters in Washington, D.C.

Personal life
Mumford's mother worked at NASA, starting at a prior organization which joined the new Agency in 1958, and retired in 1978.

Mumford is a breast cancer survivor and an active volunteer with the American Cancer Society. She participates in the annual Relay for Life fundraising event.

Career
Mumford's career with the federal government started in the U.S. Department of Education as a clerk/typist, GS-2, in July 1978.

NASA
In April 1980, Mumford joined NASA's Office of Space Transportation Systems, which was developing of the Space Shuttle, in a secretarial position. Over the next 26 years, she worked multiple positions with different organizations at NASA Headquarters and at NASA's Goddard Space Flight Center.

In 2011, she was serving as the Assistant Associate Administrator (AAA) for the Resources Management and Analysis Office, Space Operations Mission Directorate (SOMD), working with a team to manage about a third of NASA's annual budget (around $8 billion at the time). In a 2011 NASA reorganization, the Space Operations Mission Directorate (SOMD) combined with the Exploration Systems Mission Directorate to form the Human Exploration and Operations (HEO) Mission Directorate.

Mumford was then the Director of the HEO Resources Management Office. She became the Deputy AA for Policy & Plans for HEO around 2015.

In the 2020 reorganization of HEO, she became the Deputy Associate Administrator for Management, serving under Kathy Lueders.

See also
 Budget of NASA
 Women in NASA

References

NASA people
Year of birth missing (living people)
Living people
Place of birth missing (living people)